Bloomington is an unincorporated community in Clinton County, Ohio, United States.

History
Bloomington was originally called Lewisville, and under the latter name was laid out in 1842. A post office was established under the name Bloomington in 1847, and remained in operation until 1906.

Gallery

References

Unincorporated communities in Clinton County, Ohio
Unincorporated communities in Ohio